Frenchtown is an unincorporated community in Seneca County, in the U.S. state of Ohio.

History
The first settlement at Frenchtown was made in the 1840s by a colony of French people.

References

Unincorporated communities in Seneca County, Ohio
Unincorporated communities in Ohio